Tradition (subtitled The Doc Watson Family) is the title of a recording by Doc Watson and Family. It was recorded in 1964 - 1965 and not released until 1977.

Track listing
All songs Traditional.
 "Georgie" – 0:54 
 "Fish in the Mill Pond" – 1:39 
 "Julie Jenkins" – 0:42 
 "Hushabye" – 0:16 
 "Baa Nanny Black Sheep" – 0:56 
 "Sheepy and the Goat" – 0:23 
 "I Heard My Mother Weeping" – 3:02 
 "Reuben's Train" – 2:40 
 "Biscuits" – 3:14 
 "Tucker's Barn" – 2:23 
 "Give the Fiddler a Dram" – 1:52 
 "And Am I Born to Die?" – 3:29 
 "Marthy, Won't You Have Some Good Old Cider?" – 2:06 
 "A-Roving on a Winter's Night" – 1:51 
 "Arnold's Tune" – 0:46 
 "Pretty Saro" – 2:12 
 "Early, Early in the Spring" – 2:04 
 "Little Maggie" – 2:36 
 "Bill Banks" – 2:30 
 "Rambling Hobo" – 1:02 
 "One Morning in May" – 1:58 
 "The Faithful Soldier" – 3:29 
 "Omie Wise" – 2:43 
 "Jimmy Sutton" – 1:12

Personnel
Doc Watson – vocals, guitar, harmonica, banjo
Merle Watson – guitar
Gaither Carlton – banjo, fiddle, vocals 
Dolly Greer – vocals 
Annie Watson – vocals 
Arnold Watson – banjo, vocals 
Rosa Lee Watson – vocals 
Production notes
Ralph Rinzler – producer, engineer, editing, liner notes
A.L. Lloyd – liner notes

References

1977 albums
Doc Watson albums
Rounder Records albums